John Cook (fl. 1393), was an English politician.

He was a Member (MP) of the Parliament of England for Newcastle-under-Lyme in 1393. With so many politicians of this name, it is impossible to accurately identify him.

References

14th-century births
Year of death missing
English MPs 1393